The Battle of Rueil took place on 3 April 1871 between the Paris Commune and Versaillais government forces in the Île-de-France.

Bibliography 

 
 

Paris Commune
19th century in Paris
April 1871 events
Rueil
Rueil
History of Hauts-de-Seine